John Palmer Croneberger (August 25, 1938 - February 23, 2023) was a bishop of the Episcopal Church in the United States of America.  He was formerly the ninth bishop of the Diocese of Newark (based in Newark, New Jersey).

Life
Croneberger was serving as rector at the Church of the Atonement in Tenafly, New Jersey in June 1998 when he was elected as Bishop of Newark.  He was consecrated as Bishop Coadjutor on November 21 of the same year.
Croneberger succeeded Bishop John Shelby Spong on February 26, 2000 in an installation ceremony at Trinity & St. Philip's Cathedral, Newark.

As diocesan bishop, he continued Spong's agenda of radical inclusion.  Croneberger directed the creation of an established liturgy for the blessing of same-sex relationships, oversaw the massive diocesan response to the September 11 attacks, and brought Christ Hospital in Jersey City back under diocesan control. On accepting LGBTQ inclusion in the Episcopal Church, Croneberger said:
"Supporting" inclusion "may be more important than unity within the worldwide Anglican communion."

On April 6, 2005, he announced his intention to retire in January 2007, citing the health of his wife, Marilyn.

The diocese held a special convention to elect his successor on September 23, 2006.  Mark Beckwith, the rector of All Saints' Episcopal Church in Worcester, Massachusetts, was elected on the third ballot.

Croneberger also served as an Assistant Bishop of the Diocese of Bethlehem.

References

External links
 Bishop of Newark website

1938 births
Living people
Episcopal bishops of Newark